Myron Sulzberger (June 14, 1878 – September 16, 1956) was a Jewish-American lawyer, politician, and judge from New York.

Life 
Sulzberger was born on June 14, 1878 in New York City, New York, the son of Solomon Sulzberger and Esther Emden. His father was a German immigrant who served as president and treasurer of B'nai B'rith and vice-president of the Union of American Hebrew Congregations.

Sulzberger received his preliminary education in New York City public schools, after which he studied at the Weingart Institute and took a two year course at the College of the City of New York. He then went to New York Law School and was admitted to the state bar. He was an active member of the Democratic Party, giving speeches before he was old enough to vote. In 1901, he was elected to the New York State Assembly as a Democrat, representing the New York County 26th District. He served in the Assembly in 1902 and 1903. While in the Assembly, he introduced and worked with many important matters of legislation, particularly regarding insurance and canal proposition.

Sulzberger was special deputy Attorney General of New York from 1904 to 1905 and special counsel of the New York State Prison Commission from 1924 to 1927. In 1927, he was Municipal Court Justice. He was re-elected Justice in 1937. He resigned in 1941 and returned to private practice. As Justice, he was chairman of the rules committee, which recommended the establishment of a separate civil jurisdiction for small claims that became known as the Small Claims Part of Magistrate's Court. Upon his retirement from the bench, he specialized in corporate and real estate law in the firm Sulzberger, Schechter & Sulzberger, in partnership with his son Myron Jr. and Jacob Schechter.

Sulzberger was president of the Mt. Vernon Country Club and chairman of the County Committee, 14th Assembly District from 1920 to 1927, the advisory board of the Home of the Daughters of Jacob starting in 1927, and the Welfare Committee of the 1st Ave Boys, Inc. He was a member of the American Bar Association, the New York State Bar Association, the New York County Lawyers' Association, the Federal Bar Association of the Southern District of New York, the Society of Tammany, the Michael T. McCarron Association, the Yorkville Chamber of Commerce, the New York Society for the Prevention of Cruelty to Children, the Museum of Art, the Museum of Natural History, the Cosmopolitan Association, the Freemasons, the Elks, the Knights of Pythias, B'nai B'rith, the Craftsmen of Yorkville Club, and the National Democratic Club. He attended Temple Emanu-El and was honorary director of its Men's Club. In 1903, he married Rena Fuld. Their children were Myron Jr. and Edward.

Sulzberger died in White Plains General Hospital after a long illness on September 16, 1956.

References

External links 

 The Political Graveyard

1878 births
1956 deaths
American people of German-Jewish descent
City College of New York alumni
New York Law School alumni
20th-century American lawyers
Lawyers from New York City
American Reform Jews
19th-century American Jews
20th-century American Jews
Jewish American attorneys
Jewish American state legislators in New York (state)
20th-century American politicians
Politicians from Manhattan
Democratic Party members of the New York State Assembly
20th-century American judges
New York (state) state court judges
American Freemasons